The 2018 IIHF Women's World Championship Division I was two international ice hockey tournaments organised by the International Ice Hockey Federation. The Division I Group A tournament was played in Vaujany, France, and the Division I Group B tournament was played in Asiago, Italy, both from 8 to 14 April 2018.

France won the Division I Group A tournament and moved up to the Top Division, while Italy became the champions of Division I Group B and will play in the Division I Group A tournament next year.

Division I Group A

Participants

Match officials
4 referees and 7 linesmen were selected for the tournament.

Referees
 Henna Åberg
 Kristine Langley
 Meghan MacTavish
 Ramona Weiss

Linesmen
 Anne Boniface
 Stéphanie Gagnon
 Jenni Jaatinen
 Michaela Kúdeľová
 Jessica Lundgren
 Sara Strong
 Sueva Torribio

Final standings

Results
All times are local (UTC+2).

Awards and statistics

Awards
Best players selected by the directorate:
Best Goalkeeper:  Ena Nystrøm
Best Defenseman:  Gwendoline Gendarme
Best Forward:  Fanni Gasparics
Source: IIHF.com

Scoring leaders
List shows the top skaters sorted by points, then goals.

GP = Games played; G = Goals; A = Assists; Pts = Points; +/− = Plus/minus; PIM = Penalties in minutes; POS = Position
Source: IIHF.com

Leading goaltenders
Only the top five goaltenders, based on save percentage, who have played at least 40% of their team's minutes, are included in this list.

TOI = Time on Ice (minutes:seconds); SA = Shots against; GA = Goals against; GAA = Goals against average; Sv% = Save percentage; SO = Shutouts
Source: IIHF.com

Division I Group B

Participants

Match officials
4 referees and 7 linesmen were selected for the tournament.

Referees
 Vanessa Morin
 Henna-Maria Koivuluoma
 Radka Růžičková
 Laura White

Linesmen
 Tanja Cadonau
 Magdaléna Čerhitová
 Stephanie Cole
 Mirjam Gruber
 Amy Lack
 Senovwa Mollen
 Kristin Moore

Final standings

Results
All times are local (UTC+2).

Awards and statistics

Awards
Best players selected by the directorate:
Best Goalkeeper:  Giulia Mazzocchi
Best Defenseman:  Nadia Mattivi
Best Forward:  Park Jong-ah
Source: IIHF.com

Scoring leaders
List shows the top skaters sorted by points, then goals.

GP = Games played; G = Goals; A = Assists; Pts = Points; +/− = Plus/minus; PIM = Penalties in minutes; POS = Position
Source: IIHF.com

Leading goaltenders
Only the top five goaltenders, based on save percentage, who have played at least 40% of their team's minutes, are included in this list.

TOI = Time on Ice (minutes:seconds); SA = Shots against; GA = Goals against; GAA = Goals against average; Sv% = Save percentage; SO = Shutouts
Source: IIHF.com

References

External links
Official website of IIHF

2018
Division I
2018 IIHF World Championship Division I
2018 IIHF World Championship Division I
Isère
Sport in Veneto
2018 in French sport
2018 in Italian sport
April 2018 sports events in Europe